The De Valls Bluff Waterworks is a historic public water supply facility at Rumbaugh and Hazel Streets in De Valls Bluff, Arkansas. It contains a 1930s-era elevated steel water tower, built in 1936 by the Pittsburgh-Des Moines Steel Company in conjunction with the Public Works Administration as part of a project to improve the local water supply. It was added to the National Register of Historic Places in 2007, as part of a multiple-property listing that included numerous other New Deal-era projects throughout Arkansas. The property also contains several non-contributing buildings, including a shed, aeration chamber, and water tank.

See also
Cotter water tower
Cotton Plant water tower
Hampton Waterworks
Hartford Water Tower
McCrory Waterworks
Mineral Springs Waterworks
National Register of Historic Places listings in Prairie County, Arkansas

References

External links
An Ambition to be Preferred: New Deal Recovery Efforts and Architecture in Arkansas, 1933–1943, By Holly Hope

Industrial buildings and structures on the National Register of Historic Places in Arkansas
Buildings and structures completed in 1936
Buildings and structures in Prairie County, Arkansas
Water supply infrastructure on the National Register of Historic Places
Public Works Administration in Arkansas
Infrastructure completed in 1936
National Register of Historic Places in Prairie County, Arkansas
Water towers on the National Register of Historic Places in Arkansas